Rocky road is a type of no-bake slice made up of milk chocolate and marshmallows along with other ingredients, which tend to vary by country. In British influenced areas it was previously referred to as 'Tiffin' but the Australian/American name has now come to predominate in the UK. It is usually served in individual portions such as a brownie, or in American cuisine, as an ice cream flavor.

It is made by mixing melted chocolate with other ingredients, before refrigerating to set. It can then be cut into bars or square pieces.

History
The origin of the dessert is debated, but the earliest mention of it dates back to 1853 in Australia, where rocky road was supposedly created as a way to sell confectionery that had spoiled during the long trip from Europe, which were mixed with locally-grown nuts and cheap chocolate to disguise the flavour. According to this origin story, the name comes from the rocky road that travelers had to take to reach the gold fields. Additionally, many American companies claim to have invented rocky road in the 19th century.

Australia

The main ingredients in traditional Australian rocky road are:
 glace cherries or raspberries
 milk chocolate (sometimes dark or white chocolate is used)
 desiccated or shredded coconut
 nuts, particularly peanuts
 marshmallow

The most famous commercial brand of rocky road in Australia, is the Darrell Lea "original recipe" version, sold as "Rocklea Road". This version does not have cherries or raspberries, instead having bigger marshmallow chunks and more coconut. A raspberry version is also available.

United Kingdom
The main ingredients in traditional British Rocky Road are:
 dried fruit
 biscuit (usually digestives)
 milk chocolate (sometimes dark or white chocolate is used)
 a light dusting of icing sugar on the top (optional)

United States 

The main ingredients in traditional American Rocky Road are:
 milk chocolate
 marshmallow
 walnuts or almonds

The most popular version of rocky road in the U.S. is in ice cream form, which consists of chocolate ice cream, marshmallows (or sometimes a "marshmallow swirl"), and nuts.
Although not as popular, slabs of rocky road can also be found at confectioner's shops. The Annabelle Candy Company manufactures a candy bar called "Rocky Road" that has marshmallow, a thin covering of chocolate, and cashews. Betty Crocker has its own recipe for "Rocky Road".

See also
Tiffin
Hedgehog slice
Rocky road (ice cream)
Rocky Road (candy bar)

References

Australian desserts
Confectionery
Chocolate desserts